Sanjena Anshu Sathian is an American novelist and journalist. Her debut novel, Gold Diggers, was published by Penguin Press in 2021.

Early life and education 
Sathian was raised in Georgia by a Malayali father and Kannadiga mother, both immigrants from South India. She grew up in metro Atlanta and attended The Westminster Schools. In high school, she competed in policy debate, winning the national championship as a senior. She attended Yale College, graduating in 2013 with a B.A. in English. She was a recipient of a 2017 Paul & Daisy Soros Fellowship for New Americans. The fellowship supported her studies at the Iowa Writers' Workshop, from which she graduated in 2019 with an MFA in creative writing.

Career 
After graduating from college, Sathian worked as a technology journalist in San Francisco before moving to Mumbai to work as a foreign correspondent.

Sathian's debut novel, Gold Diggers, was published by Penguin Press on April 6, 2021. It was sold to Penguin Press after a seven-way auction. Gold Diggers is a magical realism novel that follows Neil Narayan, a second-generation Indian teenager from the suburbs of Atlanta. It is tale of gold heists and alchemy. In February 2021, it was announced that the novel is being adapted into a television series by Mindy Kaling's production company Kaling International. Sathian will be a co-writer and co-executive producer of the adaptation, while Kaling and Howard Klein will be its executive producers. Ron Charles of The Washington Post praised the novel's "effervescent social satire" and "astonishing cultural richness", calling it an "invaluable new alloy of American literature." Charles also compared it to the works of Aimee Bender, Karen Russell and Colson Whitehead. Publishers Weekly praised Sathian's "sharp" characterization, while Kirkus Reviews praised her "page-turner" prose. The novel was selected for The Washington Posts "10 Best Books of 2021" list.

Sathian's short stories have appeared in Boulevard, The Masters Review, Joyland, and Salt Hill. She has written nonfiction pieces, including for The New York Times, The New Yorker, The Boston Globe, the San Francisco Chronicle, Food & Wine, The Juggernaut, The Millions, and OZY.

Works

Novels

Short stories

Selected articles 
 
 
 
 
 
 
 
 
———————
Notes

References

External links 

Year of birth missing (living people)
Living people
21st-century American novelists
21st-century American women writers
American people of Kannada descent
American people of Malayali descent
American novelists of Indian descent
American women novelists
American women writers of Indian descent
Magic realism writers
Writers from Georgia (U.S. state)
Yale College alumni
Iowa Writers' Workshop alumni
The Westminster Schools alumni